João Gonçalves may refer to:
 João Gonçalves (footballer) (born 1988), Portuguese footballer
 João Gonçalves (footballer, born 2005) (born 2005), Portuguese footballer
 João Armando Gonçalves (born 1963), Portuguese member of the World Scout Committee